Ikonika (real name Sara Abdel-Hamid) is an electronic musician, producer and DJ often associated with Hyperdub Records.

Her debut 12", "Please/Simulacrum" was released in 2008 on Hyperdub.

Her debut album, Contact, Love, Want, Have was released on Hyperdub on 6 April 2010.

Discography

Albums
 Contact, Love, Want, Have (2010)
 Aerotropolis (2013)
 Distractions (2017)
 The Library Album (2018)

EPs
Hollow EP (2020)
Bodies EP (2020)
Position EP (2014)
I Make Lists EP (2012)
Edits EP (2010)

Singles
"Idiot" (2010)
"Dckhdbtch" (2010)
"Smuck" (2009)
"Sahara Michael" / "Fish" (2009)
"Millie" / "Director" (2008) HDB015
"Please" / "Simulacrum" (2008) HDB008

Compilation appearances
Unclassified ("World on Mute")

References

External links
 Ikonika in Discogs database.

English electronic musicians
English record producers
Living people
British women record producers
English women DJs
Hyperdub artists
English women in electronic music
Electronic dance music DJs
Year of birth missing (living people)